Warit Sornbutnark (born 27 February 1993) is a Thai tennis player.

Sornbutnark has a career high ATP singles ranking of 937 achieved on 29 June 2015. He also has a career high ATP doubles ranking of 753 achieved on 16 June 2014.

Sornbutnark has represented Thailand at the Davis Cup where he has a W/L record of 2–3.

External links

1993 births
Living people
Warit Sornbutnark
Warit Sornbutnark
Warit Sornbutnark
Warit Sornbutnark
Southeast Asian Games medalists in tennis
Competitors at the 2015 Southeast Asian Games
Warit Sornbutnark